Daniel Zimmermann (born 3 May 1982 in Düsseldorf) is a German politician, founder of the PETO party, and he has been the mayor of Monheim am Rhein since 21 October 2009. When elected, he was the youngest mayor in Germany.

Professional career 

Zimmermann grew up as the son of a printing press technician and an administration clerk in Baumberg. From 1988 to 1992 he attended the Geschwister-Scholl-Grundschule (elementary school) in Baumberg. Then he advanced to the Otto-Hahn-Gymnasium in Monheim, where he achieved Abitur in 2001. Afterwards he underwent civil service  at the Biologische Station Urdenbacher Kämpe e.V.. From 2002 to 2008 he studied French and  Physics at the University of Cologne to become a teacher. In  December 2008 he achieved the first Staatsexamen. At last he worked as a scientist at the Romanisches Seminar (seminar for Romance languages) at the university. He was a tutor for the  intermediate examination at the language-related sector of the subjects French, Italian, Spanish and Portuguese and prepared his PhD-thesis.

Political career 
In 1999, Zimmermann and four other teenagers founded the youth party PETO – Die junge Alternative (PETO - the young alternative). The name of the party refers to the Latin word peto (in English: „I postulate“). Zimmermann became first president of this new party until 2004. The party could rise its results continually. In 1999 they achieved 6 per cent and three seat in the city council and 2004 they improved this result with 16,6% and seven seats. In 2004 he belonged to the city council, too. Five years earlier, he had not been allowed to run for office, because he was not yet 18 years old. He was president of the city council group of PETO until 2006. He has been president of the board which controls for the town-owned companies since 2005.  
During the Monheim am Rhein city Council election PETO achieved 29,56% of the votes and twelve seats in the city council, only 108 votes less than the biggest party CDU which gained twelve seats, too. 

During the mayor election which took place simultaneously, for which he was nominated as a candidate  by his party in  August 2008, Zimmermann gained 30,35%  of the votes, which meant a relative majority, enough to win, after the two-round system had been abolished in 2007.

Works 
 „Ich kann Bürgermeister!“: Mit 27 Jahren Deutschland jüngstes Stadtoberhaupt. Fackelträger-Verlag, Köln, .

External links 
 Homepage
 hier und heute Reportage über Daniel Zimmermann auf einslive.de (German)
  Bericht der WDR Lokalzeit Düsseldorf über Daniel Zimmmermann auf einslive.de (German)
 Mit 27 Jahren Bürgermeister (German) MP3-File

References 

Mayors of places in North Rhine-Westphalia
Living people
1982 births
Politicians from Düsseldorf
University of Cologne alumni